The Paraguayan records in swimming are the fastest ever performances of swimmers from Paraguay, which are recognised and ratified by the Federacion Paraguaya De Natacion (FEPANA).

All records were set in finals unless noted otherwise.

Long Course (50 m)

Men

Women

Mixed relay

Short Course (25 m)

Men

Women

Mixed relay

See also
List of Paraguayan records in athletics

References
General
Paraguayan Long Course Records 31 May 2018 updated
Paraguayan Short Course Records 31 December 2017 updated
Specific

External links
FEPANA web site

Paraguay
Records
Swimming